Rhyacodrilinae is a subfamily of clitellate oligochaete worms in the family Naididae.

Species 
The World Register of Marine Species recognizes the following genera in the subfamily Rhyacodrilinae:

 Ainudrilus Finogenova, 1982
 Bothrioneurum Stolc, 1886
 Epirodrilus Hrabĕ, 1930
 Heronidrilus Erséus & Jamieson, 1981
 Heterodrilus Pierantoni, 1902
 Hrabeus Semernoy, 2004
 Jolydrilus Er. Marcus, 1965
 Macquaridrilus Jamieson, 1968
 Monopylephorus Levinsen, 1884
 Moraviodrilus Hrabě, 1935
 Paranadrilus Gavrilov, 1955
 Pararhyacodrilus Snimschikova, 1986
 Paupidrilus Erséus, 1990
 Peristodrilus Baker & Brinkhurst, 1981
 Protuberodrilus Giani & Martinez-Ansemil, 1979
 Rhizodrilus Smith, 1900
 Rhyacodrilus Bretscher, 1901
 Svetlovia Čekanovskaya, 1975
 Torodrilus Cook, 1970

References

Tubificina